This is a list of international visits undertaken by Condoleezza Rice (in office 2005–2009) while serving as the United States Secretary of State. The list includes both private travel and official state visits. The list includes only foreign travel which the Secretary of State made during her tenure in the position.

Summary 
The number of visits per country where Secretary Rice traveled are:
 One visit to Algeria, Argentina, Bahamas, Benin, Croatia, Czech Republic, Denmark, El Salvador, Estonia, Ethiopia, Ghana, Greece, Guatemala, Haiti, Hungary, Iceland, Kenya, Kyrgyzstan, Libya, Lithuania, Luxemburg, Malaysia, Mongolia, Morocco, Netherlands, New Zealand, Norway, Peru, Rwanda, Samoa, Senegal, Singapore, Slovakia, Spain, Sudan, Sweden, Switzerland, Tajikistan, Tanzania, Thailand, Tunisia, Uruguay and Vietnam
 Two visits to Bulgaria, Indonesia, Ireland, Italy, Kazakhstan, Latvia, Liberia, Panama, Poland, Portugal, Romania, Ukraine and Vatican City
 Three visits to Australia, Austria, Bahrain, Canada, Chile, Colombia, Georgia, Mexico, Turkey and the United Arab Emirates
 Four visits to India, Kuwait and Lebanon
 Five visits to Afghanistan, Brazil, Japan and Pakistan
 Six visits to China, Jordan and South Korea
 Eight visits to Belgium and Saudi Arabia
 Nine visits to France
 Ten visits to Germany, Iraq and Russia
 Eleven visits to Egypt 
 Thirteen visits to the United Kingdom
 Twenty-one visits to the Palestinian National Authority
 Twenty-five visits to Israel

Table

References

2005 beginnings
2008 endings
2000s in international relations
2000s politics-related lists
United States Secretary of State
S
Condoleezza Rice
United States diplomacy-related lists
|Rice
2000s timelines